The Basketball Tournament at the 2005 Mediterranean Games was held in the El Ejido Sports Hall from Friday June 24 to Friday July 1, 2005 in Almería, Spain.

Men's competition

Teams

Group A
 
 

Group B

Rosters

*(In parenthesis is reported the year of birth)

Algeria: Karim Atamna (80), Farid Belhimeur (84), Moured Boughedir (76), Sofiane Boulaya (73), Ali Bouziane (77), Djillali Canon (78), Farouk Djillali (78), Redouane Fergati (78), Abdelhalim Kaouane (81), Nadjim Ouali (71), Tarek Oukid (79), Abdelhalim Sayah (75)

Bosnia & Herzegovina: Edin Bavčić (84), Dejan Ćup (83), Nikola Đurasović (83), Bojan Đurica (83), Aldin Kadić (86), Armend Kahrimanović (80), Muris Memić (81), Miloš Mirković (83), Edin Nurkanović (82), Mujo Tuljković (79), Emir Zimić (86)

Egypt: Ibrahim Adawi (74), Ismail Ahmed (76), Wael Badr (78), Amir Fanan (80), Tarek El Ghannam (78), Samir El Hosseny (76), Mohamed El Kerdany (77), Sherif Gunadi (80), Ramy Gunady (81), Ahmed Monir, Ahmed Sakr (75), Abdelaziz Sherif

Greece: Nikos Barlos (79), Tasos Charismidis (81), Dimitrios Charitopoulos (83), Georgios Dedas (80), Ioannis Georgallis (83), Savvas Iliadis (79), Panagiotis Kafkis (80), Fanis Koumpouras (83), Nikos Papanikolopoulos (79), Angelos Siamandouras (80), Christos Tapoutos (82), Georgios Tsiakos (82)

Italy: Giorgio Boscagin (83), Marco Carraretto (77), Alessandro Cittadini (79), Christian Di Giuliomaria (79), Luca Garri (82), Jacopo Giachetti (83), Davide Lamma (76), Marco Mordente (79), Andrea Pecile (80), Tomas Ress (80), Mason Rocca (77), Walter Santarossa (78)

Morocco: Adil Baba (77), Nabil Bakkass (79), Mounir Bouhelal (79), Jaouad Dahbi (85), Alaeddine El Asli (84), Zakaria El Masbahi (79), Marouane El Mouttalibi (82), Mohamed Hjira (81), M.F. Houari Bassim (77), Mustapha Khalfi (80), Mohamed Mouak (78), Reda Rhalimi (82)

Spain: Alfons Alzamora (79), Germán Gabriel (80), Roberto Guerra (83), Rafa Martínez (82), Andres Miso (83), Álex Mumbrú (79), Ruben Quintana (80), Gullermo Rubio (82), Fernando San Emeterio (84), Sergio Sanchez (81), Jordi Trias (80), Rafael Vidaurreta (77)

Turkey: Ender Arslan (83), Firat Aydemir (80), Volkan Cetintahra (81), Huseyin Demiral (78), Ermal Kurtoglu (80), Reha Oz (78), Baris Ozcan (81), Cevher Özer (83), Valentin Pastal (84), Kaya Peker (80), Kerem Tunçeri (79), Erkan Veyseloğlu (83)

Preliminary round

Group A

Friday June 24, 2005

Saturday June 25, 2005

Monday June 27, 2005

Group B

Saturday June 25, 2005

Sunday June 26, 2005

Tuesday June 28, 2005

Final round

Semi finals
Thursday June 30, 2005

Finals
Wednesday June 29, 2005 — 7th/8th place

Wednesday June 29, 2005 — 5th/6th place

Friday July 1, 2005 —  Bronze Medal Match

Sunday July 3, 2005 —  Gold Medal Match

Final ranking

Awards

See also
EuroBasket 2005
FIBA Africa Championship 2005

Women's competition

Teams

Group A
 
 

Group B

Rosters
---

Preliminary round

Group A

Group B

Final round

Finals
Wednesday June 29, 2005 — 5th/6th place

Friday July 1, 2005 —  Bronze Medal Match

Friday July 1, 2005 —  Gold Medal Match

Final ranking

Awards

See also
EuroBasket 2005 Women

References
 Results

Basketball
Basketball at the Mediterranean Games
International basketball competitions hosted by Spain
2004–05 in Spanish basketball
2004–05 in European basketball
2005 in African basketball